Charles Pepper may refer to:

 Charles T. Pepper (1830–1903), American medical doctor, often cited as the inspiration for the name of the Dr Pepper soft drink
 Charles Pepper (cricketer) (1875–1917), English cricketer